Dingle ( or Daingean Uí Chúis, meaning "fort of Ó Cúis") is a town in County Kerry, Ireland.

Principal industries in the town are tourism, fishing and agriculture: Dingle Mart (livestock market) serves the surrounding countryside. In 2016 Dingle had a population of 2,050 with 13.7% of the population speaking Irish on a daily basis outside the education system. Dingle is situated in a Gaeltacht region. An adult Bottlenose dolphin named Fungie had been courting human contact in Dingle Bay since 1983 but disappeared in 2020.

History
A large number of Ogham stones were set up in an enclosure in the 4th and 5th centuries AD at Ballintaggart.

The town developed as a port following the Norman invasion of Ireland. By the thirteenth century, more goods were being exported through Dingle than Limerick, and in 1257 an ordinance of King Henry III imposed customs on the port's exports. By the fourteenth century, importing wine was a major business. The 1st Earl of Desmond, who held palatine powers in the area, imposed a tax on this activity around 1329. By the sixteenth century, Dingle was one of Ireland's main trading ports, exporting fish and hides and importing wines from the continent of Europe. French and Spanish fishing fleets used the town as a base.

Connections with Spain were particularly strong, and in 1529 The 11th Earl of Desmond and the ambassador of Emperor Charles V signed the Treaty of Dingle. Dingle was also a major embarkation port for pilgrims to travel to the shrine of Saint James at Santiago de Compostela. The parish church was rebuilt in the sixteenth century under "Spanish patronage" and dedicated to the saint.

In 1569 the commerce of the town was increased when it was listed as one of fifteen towns or cities which were to have a monopoly on the import of wine.

Second Desmond Rebellion

The Dingle Peninsula was the scene of much of the military activity of 1579–80. On 17 July 1579 James FitzMaurice FitzGerald brought a small fleet of ships to Dingle. He made landfall, launching the Second Desmond Rebellion, but was to die soon after in a minor skirmish with the forces of a cousin. The fleet left the town after three days, anchoring at Dún an Óir at the western end of the peninsula, leading eventually to the Siege of Smerwick of 1580.

Walled town and chartered borough
The residents of Dingle applied in 1569 for a "murage grant" to construct walls around the town. The grant was not forthcoming on that occasion. Following the defeat of the Desmond Rebellion, Queen Elizabeth directed that a royal charter be granted to incorporate the town as a borough, and to allow for the construction of walls. Traces of these town walls can still be seen, while the street layout preserves the pattern of burgage plots.

Although Elizabeth intended to grant a charter, the document was only obtained in 1607. On 2 March of that year her successor, James I, sealed the charter, although the borough and its corporation had already been in existence for twenty-two years. The head of the corporation was the sovereign, fulfilling the role of a mayor. In addition to the sovereign, who was elected annually on the Feast of St Michael, the corporation consisted of twelve burgesses. The area of jurisdiction of the corporation was all land and sea within two Irish miles of the parish church. The borough also had admiralty jurisdiction over Dingle, Ventry, Smerwick and Ferriter's Creek "as far as an arrow would fly".

The charter also created Dingle a parliamentary borough, or constituency, electing two members to the House of Commons of the Irish Parliament.

Linen

Dingle suffered greatly in the Nine Years' War and the Wars of the Three Kingdoms, being burnt or sacked on a number of occasions. The town started to recover in the eighteenth century, due to the efforts of the Fitzgerald family, Knights of Kerry, who established themselves at "The Grove" at this time. Robert Fitzgerald imported flax seed and by 1755 a flourishing linen industry had been established, with cloth worth £60,000 produced annually. The trade collapsed following the industrial production of cotton in Great Britain, and was virtually extinct by 1837. The town fell victim to a cholera plague in 1849.

Fishing
Dingle is a major fishing port, and the industry dates back to about 1830. The 1870s saw major development, when "nobby" fleets from the Isle of Man came in search of mackerel. Lowestoft herring trawlers subsequently joined the fleet, allowing for a longer fishing season. The pier and maritime facilities were developed by the Congested Districts Board, and the arrival of rail transport in 1891 allowed for the transport of fish throughout the country, and a canning and curing industry developed.

Education
There are three primary schools in Dingle: Scoil An Ghleanna, Scoil Iognáid Rís and Bunscoil an Clochair. There are also two secondary schools - Pobalscoil Chorca Dhuibhne and Coláiste Íde Boarding School. Dingle as part of the Corca Dhuibhne Gaeltacht also hosts Irish School for students during the Summer.

The Sacred Heart University, Connecticut, USA, has an Irish studies centre in Dingle.

Places of interest
Dingle's St. Mary's is a neo-Gothic church built to designs by J. J. McCarthy and O'Connell. The foundation stone was laid in 1862. It originally had a nave and aisles separated by arcades, supported on columns capped by octagonal tops. The arcades were demolished in one of the most radical reordering schemes to have been executed in Ireland.  The project also saw the demolition of the exterior walls to below the original clerestory level, and, most notably, of the attic and upper ranges of the west elevation.

The Chapel of the Sacred Heart is a neo-gothic chapel attached to Saint Mary's. It was built for a local enclosed order of Presentation Sisters, by the architect C. J. McCarthy in 1886. The major Irish artist Harry Clarke produced six double-lancet stained glass windows for the chapel which were installed in 1924. The lancets depict scenes from the life of Christ. Clarke was at the time a leading figure in the Arts and Crafts movement and was paid a fee of £1,000 for the works.

There are many opportunities to hear traditional Irish music , particularly during the summer tourist season. Dingle has a number of pubs as well as restaurants and cafes. The aquarium, "Oceanworld Aquarium", is home to a number of tropical, foreign and native animals, and a number of art and craft shops.

Dingle is home to Murphy's Ice Cream, a cafe that serves ice cream and coffee. Murphy's has homemade ice cream made from Kerry cattle.

Dingle Distillery was launched in Dingle in 2012.

Gallaunmore, a standing stone and National Monument, lies 3 km (2 miles) to the east.

St. Manchan's Oratory (An Teampall Geal), a medieval oratory with ogham stone and souterrain, lies on nearby Lateeve Hill.

Sport
Dingle is home to the Dingle GAA club, which plays the popular game of Gaelic football. The most noted tournament in which Dingle competes is the Kerry Senior Football Championship. Rugbaí Chorca Dhuibhne, the local rugby team, and Dingle Bay Rovers F.C. are based in the area.

Transport

Bus routes serving Dingle include routes to Killarney, to Tralee, to Kerry Airport, to Cloghane (via Castlegregory), and to Ballydavid (via Ballyferriter and Dunquin).

Car rental services are available primarily from Kerry Airport, with international and local businesses operating services.

Dingle was formerly the western terminus of the narrow-gauge Tralee and Dingle Light Railway, which closed in 1953.  The station was sited opposite the hospital, on the N86 road into the town from Lispole, where an undertakers premises and disused petrol station now stand.  The railway station opened on 1 April 1891, closed for passenger traffic on 17 April 1939 and for regular goods traffic on 10 March 1947, finally closing altogether on 1 July 1953, by which time a cattle train once per month was the sole operation.

Today, the closest train terminal is Tralee, with bus services operating from Tralee Bus and Rail Stations. In addition, bus services operate from Killarney Bus and Rail Stations to Dingle.

Name
In 2005, Minister for Community, Rural and Gaeltacht Affairs Éamon Ó Cuív announced that anglicised place names (such as 'Dingle') of Gaeltacht towns and villages would no longer feature on official signposts, and only the Irish language names would appear. The English-language version of the town's name was thus officially dropped in early 2005, with the largely colloquial Irish name An Daingean being advanced.

In the case of Dingle, the move was particularly controversial, as the town relies heavily on the tourist industry, and there was fear that the change could prevent visitors from finding the town. Detractors noted that tourists might not recognise the Irish name on signposts and that there could also be confusion with a similarly named town (Daingean) in County Offaly. Supporters rejected this argument, pointing out that there are numerous towns in Ireland with similar names. The minister added to the controversy by suggesting that a name change to English could be brought about by removing the town's Gaeltacht status, thereby losing its entitlement to government grants for Irish-speaking areas.

In late 2005, Kerry County council approved the holding of a plebiscite for the change of name to the bilingual "Dingle/Daingean Uí Chúis" which took place in October 2006. The result was announced on 20 October, and 1,005 of the 1,086 returned ballots (electorate: 1,222) favoured the change to the bilingual version. Éamon Ó Cuív stated, however, that there was no remit to act on the results of the plebiscite. Nevertheless, in 2008, Minister for the Environment, Heritage and Local Government John Gormley announced his intention to amend the local government laws to allow names chosen by plebiscite to supersede any Placenames Order under the Official Languages Act 2003. This would mean that Daingean Uí Chúis would be the official name of the town in Irish, with "Dingle" the official name in English. However, the name of the town on road signs within the Gaeltacht will continue to display the name of the town in Irish only. In the meantime, some locals took matters into their own hands by spray painting "Dingle" on road signs that bore only the Irish version of the name. Section 48 of the Environment (Miscellaneous Provisions) Act 2011 specifically made "Dingle" the English name and "Daingean Uí Chúis" the Irish name.

People
 Daniel Cavanagh, former member of the Wisconsin State Assembly and the Wisconsin State Senate
 Joe Higgins T.D.
 Mark O'Connor, Australian Football League premiership player (2022) for Geelong Football Club
 Joe O'Toole, Senator
 Pauline Scanlon, singer
 All members of the alternative rock band, Walking on Cars
 Mícheál Ó Muircheartaigh, Gaelic games commentator
 James Louis Rice, Irish Count of the Holy Roman Empire

See also

 Dingle, Liverpool
Eask Tower
MV Ranga, a ship wrecked near Slea Head, Dingle
 Wild Atlantic Way

References
Notes

Bibliography

External links

 

 
Towns and villages in County Kerry
Gaeltacht places in County Kerry
Gaeltacht towns and villages